Red Willow County is a county located in the U.S. state of Nebraska. As of the 2020 United States Census, the population was 10,702. Its county seat is McCook.

In the Nebraska license plate system, Red Willow County is represented by the prefix 48 (it had the forty-eighth-largest number of vehicles registered in the county when the license plate system was established in 1922).

History
Red Willow County was formed in 1873. It was named for the Red Willow Creek. The name is reported to be a mistranslation of the Dakota Indian name Chanshasha Wakpala, which literally means Red Dogwood Creek. The Dakota referred to the creek thusly due to red dogwood shrubs that grew along the creek banks. Its stem and branches are deep red in color, and it is favored in basket making.

Geography
Red Willow County lies on the south line of Nebraska. The south boundary line of Red Willow County abuts the north boundary line of the state of Kansas. The Republican River runs easterly through the north-central part of the county. The county terrain consists of rolling hills, sloping to the east. The portions of the terrain in the drainage basins are used for agriculture.

Major highways

  U.S. Highway 6
  U.S. Highway 34
  U.S. Highway 83
  Nebraska Highway 89

Adjacent counties

 Furnas County – east
 Decatur County, Kansas – south
 Rawlins County, Kansas – southwest
 Hitchcock County – west
 Frontier County – north

Protected areas
 Red Willow Reservoir State Wildlife Management Area (part)

Demographics

As of the 2000 United States Census, there were 11,448 people, 4,710 households, and 3,188 families in the county. The population density was 16 people per square mile (6/km2).  There were 5,278 housing units at an average density of 7 per square mile (3/km2). The racial makeup of the county was 97.55% White, 0.16% Black or African American, 0.38% Native American, 0.17% Asian, 0.02% Pacific Islander, 0.93% from other races, and 0.80% from two or more races. 2.45% of the population were Hispanic or Latino of any race.

There were 4,710 households, out of which 30.20% had children under the age of 18 living with them, 57.50% were married couples living together, 7.20% had a female householder with no husband present, and 32.30% were non-families. 28.60% of all households were made up of individuals, and 13.50% had someone living alone who was 65 years of age or older. The average household size was 2.37 and the average family size was 2.92.

In the county, the population was spread out, with 24.90% under the age of 18, 8.80% from 18 to 24, 24.60% from 25 to 44, 22.60% from 45 to 64, and 19.00% who were 65 years of age or older. The median age was 40 years. For every 100 females there were 93.90 males. For every 100 females age 18 and over, there were 91.30 males.

The median income for a household in the county was $32,293, and the median income for a family was $40,279. Males had a median income of $27,768 versus $18,768 for females. The per capita income for the county was $16,303. About 7.60% of families and 9.60% of the population were below the poverty line, including 11.40% of those under age 18 and 7.60% of those age 65 or over.

Communities

Cities 

 Indianola
 McCook  (county seat)

Villages 

 Bartley
 Danbury
 Lebanon

Unincorporated communities 

 Marion
 Perry
 Shippee

Politics
Red Willow County voters have been reliably Republican for several decades. In no national election since 1936 has the county selected the Democratic Party candidate (as of 2020), and only five total from 1900 to the present.

See also
 National Register of Historic Places listings in Red Willow County, Nebraska

References

External links

 
1873 establishments in Nebraska
Populated places established in 1873